Benjamin Heng (born 1976) is a Singaporean actor, known for starring in the romantic action film Eating Air, the comedy film Lelio Popo, and in the horror comedy film Zombiepura, as well as in several television series, such as Anything Goes, Durian King and Money No Problem!.

Early life and education
Heng was a student of maritime transportation at Singapore Polytechnic.

Career
Prior to acting, Heng had worked as a waiter, a Mexican cook, a stagehand and in a watch factory. Heng made his acting debut by starring in Kelvin Tong and Jasmine Ng's romantic action film Eating Air in 1999. He starred in the television series The Frontline in 2003. In 2004, he signed up with SPH MediaWorks after leaving Fly Entertainment. By then, he had appeared in the television series Brand New Towkay. He also starred in the television series Durian King and Money No Problem!, which were filmed in July. Later that year, he starred in the medical drama Heal And Be Healed. He appeared in the 2006 romance film Love Story. In 2006, he used his retrenchment package from SPH MediaWorks and borrowed money from family members in order to open the Flowerbed Kitchen & Bar noodle eatery. The eatery's chef was former actress Deborah Sim whom he met on the set of Heal And Be Healed. It closed in 2007, resulting in a "six-figure loss". He starred in the 2007 horror comedy film Men in White.

Heng rejoined Fly Entertainment under a three-year contract in 2008. He starred in the comedy series Calefare. He starred in the 2010 comedy film Lelio Popo. He played a supporting role in the 2011 horror film Twisted. Later that year, he appeared in the sitcom Anything Goes, as well as the television series Days When We Are Young. He also played a supporting role in the 2012 comedy film Dance Dance Dragon. He appeared in the television series The Recruit Diaries. He appeared in the television series The Dream Job in 2016. He was featured in the special four-episode series On The Red Dot — In My Helper's Shoes. He starred in the 2018 horror comedy film Zombiepura, which he co-produced. He appeared in the 2019 romantic comedy film When Ghost Meets Zombie. Later that year, he starred in the 2019 TV miniseries I'm Madam!.

Personal life
Heng was married to Michelle Ng, a former marketing manager, with whom he had one daughter, Sophie. Ng died on 15 June 2019.

Filmography

Film
 Eating Air (1999)
 Love Story (2006)
 Men in White (2007)
 Twisted (2011)
 Dance Dance Dragon (2012)
 Filial Party (2014)
 Zombiepura (2018)
 When Ghost Meets Zombie (2019)

Television
 Brand New Towkay (2001)
 The Frontline (2003)
 Durian King (2004)
 Heal And Be Healed (2004)
 Money No Problem! (2004)
 Tiramisu (2005)
 Parental Guidance (2007)
 Calefare (2008)
 Taste of Love (2008)
 Goodbye Kucinta (2009)
 Secret Garden (2010)
 Days When We Are Young (2011)
 Dragon’s Inn (2011)
 Fatherhood (2011)
 Feast Fight (2011)
 Point of Entry (2011)
 We Are Singaporeans (2011)
 You're History (2011)
 The Diary of Amos Lee (2012)
 C.L.I.F. 2 (2013)
 Journey With Me (2013)
 The Recruit Diaries (2013)
 Koji Cooks (2014)
 Mata Mata (2014)
 Working Class (2014)
 118 (2015)
 On The Red Dot — In My Helper's Shoes (2015)
 You Can Be an Angel Too (2015)
 The Dream Job (2016)
 Faculty (2017)
 Meet the MP (2017)
 Mind Matters (2018)
 I'm Madam! (2019)
 Third Rail (2022)

References

Living people
Singaporean male film actors
Singaporean male television actors
1976 births